Veronika Oberhuber (born 1 February 1967) is an Italian luger who has competed during the 1980s. She won the gold medal in the mixed team event at the 1989 FIL World Luge Championships in Winterberg, West Germany. Oberhuber competed in two Winter Olympics, earning her beat finish of 11th at Sarajevo in 1984.

References

External links
Women's singles top eight finishers at the Winter Olympics: 1964-2002 

Italian female lugers
Living people
Lugers at the 1984 Winter Olympics
Lugers at the 1988 Winter Olympics
Italian lugers
1967 births
Olympic lugers of Italy
People from St. Lorenzen
Germanophone Italian people
Sportspeople from Südtirol